The 2024 United States House of Representatives elections in Montana will be held on November 5, 2024, to elect the two U.S. Representatives from the state of Montana, one from each of the state's congressional districts. The elections will coincide with the U.S. presidential election, as well as other elections to the House of Representatives, elections to the United States Senate, and various state and local elections.

District 1 

The 1st district is based in mountainous Western Montana, including the cities of Missoula, Bozeman and Butte. The incumbent is Republican Ryan Zinke, who was elected with 49.6% of the vote in 2022. He has expressed interest in running for U.S. Senate against incumbent Jon Tester.

Republican primary

Potential 
 Ryan Zinke, incumbent U.S. Representative

General election

Predictions

District 2 

The 2nd district encompasses much of the state east of the Continental Divide, including the cities of Billings, Great Falls and Helena. The incumbent is Republican Matt Rosendale, who was re-elected with 56.6% of the vote in 2022. He has expressed interest in running for U.S. Senate against incumbent Jon Tester.

Republican primary

Potential 
 Matt Rosendale, incumbent U.S. Representative

General election

Predictions

References 

2024
Montana
United States House of Representatives